Harry Fenton may refer to:

Harry E. Fenton of the European Country Music Association
Harry Fenton (designer) of Royal Doulton Figurines
Harry Fenton, character in Peaky Blinders (TV series)

See also
Henry Fenton (disambiguation)